Luis Augusto Castro Quiroga (8 April 1942 – 2 August 2022) was a Colombian Roman Catholic prelate.

Biography
Castro Quiroga was born in Colombia and was ordained to the priesthood in 1967. He served as the titular bishop of Aquae Flaviae and the vicar apostolic of San Vicente from 1986 to 1998 and as archbishop of the Roman Catholic Archdiocese of Tunja, Colombia from 1998 until his retirement in 2020.

He died as a result of COVID-19.

References

1942 births
2022 deaths
Deaths from the COVID-19 pandemic in Colombia
Colombian Roman Catholic bishops
Colombian Roman Catholic archbishops
Bishops appointed by Pope John Paul II
Pontifical Xavierian University alumni
People from Tunja